Constantinos represented Cyprus in the Eurovision Song Contest 1996 with the song "Mono gia mas". It finished 9th with 72 points.

Before Eurovision

National final 
The final was held on 5 March 1996 at the Monte Caputo Nightclub in Limassol, hosted by Marina Maleni-Kyriazi and broadcast on RIK 1 and RIK Sat. The winner was chosen by a 20-member jury panel. In addition to the performances of the competing entries, 1995 Cypriot representative Alexandros Panayi performed as guest. Prior to the event, Cypriot broadcaster CyBC opened the submission period for interested artists and composers to submit their entries. 43 songs were submitted, from which, 8 competing entries were selected by 8-member jury panel for the national final.

At Eurovision 
In 1996, for the only time in Eurovision history, an audio-only pre-qualifying round of the 29 songs entered (excluding hosts Norway who were exempt) was held in March in order for the seven lowest-scoring songs to be eliminated before the final. Cyprus received 42 points, placing joint 15th and thus qualifying for the final in Oslo.

On the night of the contest Constantinos Christoforou performed 5th, following Portugal and preceding Malta. At the close of voting, he received 72 points (including maximum 12 points from Greece and the United Kingdom), placing 9th of 23 competing countries. The Cypriot jury awarded its 12 points to Portugal.

Voting

Qualifying round

Final

References 

1996
Countries in the Eurovision Song Contest 1996
Eurovision